June Carroll (1917 – May 16, 2004) was an American lyricist, singer and actress.

Born June Sillman in Detroit, Michigan, Carroll appeared in the Broadway musical New Faces of 1952, introducing the now-standard Guess Who I Saw Today, by Elise Boyd and Murray Grand, as well as two songs that she wrote with Arthur Siegel, "Penny Candy" and "Love is a Simple Thing". The Sauter-Finegan Orchestra recorded "Love is a Simple Thing."

She and Siegel also wrote "Monotonous," introduced by Eartha Kitt in the show. It became one of her signature songs.

She was the sister of the Broadway producer Leonard Sillman, who produced New Faces of 1952, and the wife of Sidney Carroll, the screenwriter. She had four children, including composer Steve Reich from her first marriage, in 1935, to Leonard Reich, and Jonathan Carroll and David Carroll, American authors, from her second marriage, in 1940.

Carroll died from complications of Parkinson's disease in Los Angeles at the age of 86.

References

Variety "June Carroll: Performer, Singer and Broadway Lyricist" (archive from 12 November 2012, accessed 23 March 2018).
Playbill.com "June Carroll, Performer and Lyricist for New Faces and Other Shows, Dead at 86"

External links

 
 
 
 

1917 births
2004 deaths
American musical theatre lyricists
American stage actresses
Jewish American actresses
Actresses from Detroit
20th-century American singers
Burials at Mount Sinai Memorial Park Cemetery
20th-century American women singers
20th-century American Jews
21st-century American Jews
21st-century American women